The 2009 BWF Super Series was the third season of the BWF Super Series. Like the previous season, the twelve tournaments were all hosted by nations in Asia and Europe with the Malaysia Open as the opening tournament and China Open as the final tournament in the season.

Schedule
Below is the schedule released by the Badminton World Federation:

Results

Winners

Performance by countries
Tabulated below are the Super Series performances based on countries. Only countries who have won a title are listed:

References

 
BWF Super Series